4U 1543-475 is a recurrent X-ray transient. It is a member of a black hole binary and is in the constellation of Lupus. Its optical counterpart is IL Lupi. Outburst from 4U 1543-475 was first observed by Uhuru in 1971.

See also 
 List of black holes
 List of nearest black holes

References 

Lupus (constellation)
Stellar black holes
X-ray binaries